The Pepsi Max 400 was a NASCAR Sprint Cup Series stock car race held annually at the Auto Club Speedway in Fontana, California. It was the second of two Sprint Cup Series races held at the Auto Club Speedway (the other being the Auto Club 500) and in 2009 and 2010 it was run in October as part of the Chase for the Sprint Cup.

History
The event was first held in 2004, added as part of the 2004 NASCAR Realignment, and was partially featured in the film, Herbie: Fully Loaded. From its inception until 2008 the race was run on Labor Day weekend, which was previously the traditional date of the Southern 500 at Darlington, and in the Inland Empire in the 1970s, the former California 500 United States Auto Club Marlboro Championship Trail race. The 2005 race was famous for Kyle Busch becoming the youngest NASCAR Cup Series winner ever (then known as the Nextel Cup Series).

As part of the 2009 realignment in NASCAR Auto Club Speedway, Talladega Superspeedway, and Atlanta Motor Speedway agreed to switch dates, with the Atlanta race moving from its traditional fall date to Labor Day weekend and becoming known as the Labor Day Classic 500. The realignment returned the Labor Day weekend race to the southern United States and gave California its first late season race since the final running of the Winston Western 500 at Riverside International Raceway in 1987. The AMP Energy 500 at Talladega moved into the race date vacated by Atlanta, with the Pepsi 500 moving into Talladega's former October date.

The Pepsi 500 name was used in August 2008, with Pepsi taking title sponsorship from Sharp.  This announcement was made by the speedway's website, Pepsi has been the official soft drink sponsor of the speedway since 1997, before Auto Club Speedway became part of International Speedway Corporation, owner of several circuits on the NASCAR schedule. This was done despite ISC signing a contract with Coca-Cola to replace Pepsi as the official soft drink sponsor of its racetracks in 2008 (the contract is slowly being phased in).

NASCAR announced on January 13, 2010 that they would be shortened 100 miles. NASCAR then announced that, due largely to poor attendance, the 2010 running of this race would be the last as Auto Club Speedway returned to a single date on the Sprint Cup schedule as that race was exchanged to Kansas Speedway in 2011 marking a 2nd race date on June 5, 2011.

Past winners

2005: Race extended due to a green–white–checker finish. Kyle Busch became the youngest Cup Series race winner in 3½ years.
2010: First event to only be 400 miles/200 laps in length. Tony Stewart scored his first win at Auto Club Speedway in his 19th start at the track, leaving with only Darlington and Las Vegas as the tracks he has failed to win at along with Kentucky.

Multiple winners (drivers)

Multiple winners (teams)

Manufacturer wins

References

External links
 

2004 establishments in California
2010 disestablishments in California
Former NASCAR races
 
PepsiCo
Recurring sporting events disestablished in 2010
Recurring sporting events established in 2004
Defunct sports competitions in the United States